Rowing Ireland, formerly the Irish Amateur Rowing Union, is the governing body of rowing for Ireland. It is a cross-border organisation administering the sport in both the Republic of Ireland and Northern Ireland.

Rowing Ireland is a member of the Olympic Council of Ireland and the Fédération Internationale des Sociétés d’Aviron (FISA).

Membership 
In excess of 100 clubs are affiliated to Rowing Ireland. These are from every part of the island and include schools, third level institutions and open clubs.

In 2019 Rowing Ireland launched its strategy until 2024. This has four pillars: Supporting clubs, High Performance, Rowing for all and Leading our sport.

National Rowing Centre 
The National Rowing Centre (NRC) in Farran Wood, Cork is the headquarters of Rowing Ireland and is also the base of the High Performance team. The centre has an eight-lane Albano course and hosts a number of regattas and the Championship Regatta each year. Every four years it hosts the Home International Regatta. In 1999 and 2008 it hosted the Coupe de la Jeunesse It successfully hosted the event again in 2018.

Irish Championships 

Established in 1899 as the Irish Amateur Rowing Union, the association hosted its first championship in 1912. At the 1912 AGM, which was held in February, it was agreed that a cup be purchased for £100 for the Union to be presented for annual competition amongst senior eights. This would in time become known as "The Big Pot".
The inaugural Senior eights championship took place at Metropolitan Regatta in Ringsend on the Lower Liffey in July 1912 and City of Derry Boating Club were the winners. It would be 1934 before the Junior (Intermediate) eights championship was added. Since then many additional championships have been added and 44 are now contested each year at the Championship Regatta. In 2017 it added the Irish Offshore Rowing Championship and in 2018 the inaugural Irish Coastal Rowing Championships took place.

World Championships 
Ireland has won ten gold, nine silver and eight bronze medals at the World Championships. The Gold winners were:

European Championships 
2016 Gary O'Donovan and Paul O'Donovan were European Champions in the lightweight men's double sculls.

2017 Shane O’Driscoll and Mark O’Donovan were European Champions in the lightweight men's pair. Gary and Paul O’Donovan won silver in the lightweight men's double sculls and Denise Walsh won silver in the lightweight women's single sculls. .

2019 Sanita Pušpure won the W1X at the European Championships.

Olympics 
Ireland first participated at the 1948 Olympics when a men's eight represented Ireland. It participated at 11 subsequent games. The Rio games in 2016 were its most successful with three crews participating and Ireland's first olympic rowing medal. Gary O'Donovan and Paul O'Donovan won silver in the LM2x. Claire Lambe and Sinead Jennings became the first women's crew to make an Olympic final where they finished sixth. Due to weather conditions Sanita Pušpure was unfortunate to only finish thirteenth. Prior to this Ireland's best performances had been fourth place on two occasions. In 1976 Sean Drea came fourth in Montreal and in 1996 the Lightweight four also finished fourth in Atlanta. In September 2019 Ireland qualified four boats for the 2020 Olympics and will have an opportunity to qualify further crews at the final qualifying regatta in 2020. The boats qualified to date are the W1X, W2-, M2X, LM2X.

References

External links 
 Rowing Ireland Homepage
 Get Going...Get Rowing Homepage
 Irish Rowing Archives Homepage
 Rowing Ireland on Twitter

1899 establishments in Ireland
Ireland
Rowing in Ireland
Rowing